Kari Elizabeth Byron (born December 18, 1974) is an American television host, best known for her role on the MythBusters and White Rabbit Project series.

Early life
Byron was born in the Bay Area, California. She graduated from Los Gatos High School in Los Gatos, California, and studied at San Francisco State University, graduating in May 1998 with a Bachelor of Arts in film and sculpture. She spent the following year backpacking, primarily in South Asia, and was involved in a number of art projects.

Career

MythBusters

Byron was a cast member on MythBusters from 2004 to 2014. Along with fellow cast members Tory Belleci and Grant Imahara she was part of what is commonly referred to as "The Build Team" or B Team. This Build Team worked with Adam Savage and Jamie Hyneman to test the plausibility of various myths throughout their tenure with the show. She and the others also hosted their own segments. She became involved in the show after persistently showing up at Hyneman's M5 Industries workshop in a desire to get hired by his company. She and the other Build Team members were given a more prominent role beginning with the show's second season. Not having had a long history in show business, Byron at first found it difficult to act naturally with this more visible position but gradually became more accustomed to it.

During the second half of the 2009 season, Byron was on maternity leave and was temporarily replaced by Jessi Combs. From 2010–2011, Byron had her own show, Head Rush, on the Science Channel, geared toward science education and teens.

Byron has also hosted the 2010 and 2011 editions of Large, Dangerous Rocket Ships for the Science Channel. She and Belleci made a guest appearance on the October 3, 2012, episode of the Discovery series Sons of Guns. They test-fired some of the weapons in the Red Jacket shop and watched as the staff re-tested a myth previously busted by the Build Team: that a propane tank could explode if struck by a bullet. She left the show in 2014.

Byron and Belleci hosted coverage of Pumpkin Chunkin on the Science Channel from 2011 to 2014. In 2015, Byron and Belleci hosted Thrill Factor, a new show for the Travel Channel.

White Rabbit Project
Byron, along with Imahara and Belleci, hosted the Netflix production White Rabbit Project, released on Netflix on December 9, 2016. The series focused on unusual aspects from history and pop culture.

Crash Test World
Byron is currently host of the series Crash Test World. The first season of six episodes aired on Science Channel starting January 8, 2021.

EXPLR Media
Byron is currently the co-founder of EXPLR Media, an education streaming service. "I want our audience to be able to look at every show that we do and find somebody that looks like them." (Byron)

Personal life
Byron married artist Paul Urich in March 2006. They have a daughter. On June 26, 2019, Byron petitioned for separation from Urich and their marriage was dissolved on March 20, 2020.

She was previously a vegetarian, but now describes herself as pescetarian.

Byron continues to create art, including paintings created by igniting gunpowder.  In 2018 she published a memoir Crash Test Girl, with HarperOne. Byron is credited with creating the original cover art, and providing interior art, for canvas: poems (Viewless Wings Press, 2021), using the black powder technique.

In Crash Test Girl, Byron states she has "contended with severe bouts of depression" since she was twelve. She states she has depressive episodes "a few times a year"; in addition, she had postpartum depression, more severe than her normal depression, for six months after her daughter was born.

References

External links

 
 

1974 births
Living people
Television personalities from San Francisco
San Francisco State University alumni
People from Los Gatos, California